Primera División A (Méxican First A Division) is a Mexican football tournament. This season was composed of Invierno (winter) 1997 and Verano (summer) 1998. Pachuca, the Invierno 1997 champion, were able to gain promotion to Primera Division for the 1998-99 season after winning the playoff to Tigrillos, the Verano 1998 champion.

Changes for the 1997–98 season
Acapulco was bought by Toluca, the team was relocated to State of Mexico and renamed Atlético Mexiquense.
Atlético Hidalgo relocated to Querétaro and renamed Halcones de Querétaro.
Four new expansion teams: Unión de Curtidores, Chivas Tijuana, Tecos Colima and Cuautitlán.
Pachuca was relegated from Primera División.
Bachilleres, was promoted from Segunda División.

Stadiums and locations

Invierno 1997

Group league tables

Group 1

Group 2

Group 3

Group 4

General league table

Results

Liguilla

Top scorers

Verano 1998

Group league tables

Group 1

Group 2

Group 3

Group 4

General league table

Results

Liguilla

Top scorers

Relegation table

Promotion final
At the end of the season, the two champions played a final to determine the winner of the promotion to Primera División. The series faced Pachuca, champion of the Invierno 1997 tournament against Tigrillos, champion of the Verano 1998 tournament.

First leg

Second leg

References

1997–98 in Mexican football
Ascenso MX seasons